= Illukpelessa =

- Village
- Location within Sri Lanka
- Coordinates: 7°7′N 80°49′E
- Country: Sri Lanka
- Province: Central Province
- Time zone: UTC+5:30 (Sri Lanka Standard Time)

Illukpelessa is a village in Sri Lanka. It is located within Central Province.

== See also ==
- List of towns in Central Province, Sri Lanka
